Stella Johnson may refer to:
 Esther Johnson, English friend of Jonathan Swift, known as "Stella"
 Stella Johnson (basketball), American basketball player
 Stella Johnson (photographer), American photographer